The 1876 United States presidential election in New Jersey took place on November 7, 1876, as part of the 1876 United States presidential election. Voters chose nine representatives, or electors to the Electoral College, who voted for president and vice president.

New Jersey voted for the Democratic nominee, Samuel J. Tilden, over the Republican nominee, Rutherford B. Hayes. Tilden won the state by a narrow margin of 5.65%.

Results

Results by county

See also
 United States presidential elections in New Jersey

References

New Jersey
1876
1876 New Jersey elections